Doris Lussier (15 July 1918, Fontainebleau, Estrie, Quebec – 28 October 1993) was a French Canadian comedian and actor, and political activist. He was for many years the personal secretary of Georges-Henri Lévesque, but became famous as a comedian with the character of Père Gédéon, which was later included in the television series Les Plouffes.

Lussier was a close friend of René Lévesque and was involved in the Quebec sovereignty movement. He died in 1993, aged 75.

References

External links
 
 Doris Lussier in L'Encyclopédie de L'Agora 
 Doris Lussier profile, Emissions.ca 
 Profile, service.vigile.quebec; retrieved 13 July 2015. 

1918 births
1993 deaths
Male actors from Quebec

Canadian activists
Canadian male television actors
20th-century Canadian male actors
Place of death missing
Université Laval alumni
Academic staff of Université Laval